Timofei Mikhailovich Shishkanov (born June 10, 1983) is a Russian former ice hockey forward. He played 24 games in the National Hockey League with the Nashville Predators and St. Louis Blues between 2003 and 2006. The rest of his career, which lasted from 1999 to 2019, was mainly spent in the Kontinental Hockey League.

Playing career
Shishkanov played in the 1997 Quebec International Pee-Wee Hockey Tournament with the HC Spartak Moscow youth team.

Shishkanov was drafted by the Nashville Predators as their second-round pick, 33rd overall, in the 2001 NHL Entry Draft. He played two games for the Predators before on January 29, 2006, Shishkanov was traded to the St. Louis Blues for Mike Sillinger.

Career statistics

Regular season and playoffs

International

References

External links

1983 births
Living people
Amur Khabarovsk players
Atlant Moscow Oblast players
Avangard Omsk players
HC CSKA Moscow players
HC Sibir Novosibirsk players
HC Sochi players
HC Spartak Moscow players
HC Vityaz players
Milwaukee Admirals players
Nashville Predators draft picks
Nashville Predators players
Ice hockey people from Moscow
Peoria Rivermen (AHL) players
Quebec Remparts players
Russian ice hockey left wingers
St. Louis Blues players
PSK Sakhalin players
SKA Saint Petersburg players
THK Tver players
Tohoku Free Blades players
Torpedo Nizhny Novgorod players